The Throes may refer to:

The Throes (album), 2004 album by Two Gallants
The Throes (band), alternative rock band
"Throes", a song by Phinehas from the album The Last Word Is Yours to Speak